The 1915 Chattanooga Moccasins football team represented the University of Chattanooga—now known as the University of Tennessee at Chattanooga—during the 1915 Southern Intercollegiate Athletic Association football season. Led by first-year head coach Johnny Spiegel, the Moccasins compiled an overall record of 5–2–2 with a mark of 3–1–2 in conference play.

Schedule

References

Chattanooga
Chattanooga Mocs football seasons
Chattanooga Moccasins football